The Findhorn Viaduct is a railway bridge approximately 500 metres east of the village of Tomatin in the Scottish Highlands, which carries the Perth to Inverness railway line over the valley of the River Findhorn.

The bridge was designed and built for the Highland Railway between 1894 and 1897 by Murdoch Paterson, their chief engineer, and John Folwer, who also worked on the design of the Forth Rail Bridge. It was opened to traffic on 19 July 1897.

The bridge consists of nine lattice girder spans, constructed with double warren steel trusses, similar to those used by Fowler on the Forth Rail Bridge, held up by slender, tapering piers of tooled rubble. Curving gently across the valley, with an overall length of roughly 405 metres and standing 43 metres above the level of the river,  it is described as 'spectacular' by Benedict Le Vay.

The bridge, which is still in active use, was designated a Category B listed building in 1971. It shares its name with another Findhorn Viaduct which crosses the same river near the town of Forres in Moray.

References 

Railway bridges in Scotland
Category B listed buildings in Moray
Viaducts in Scotland